Zoran Pančić (born 25 September 1953 in Novi Sad) is a Serbian rower who competed for Yugoslavia. He and Milorad Stanulov are the only Serbs to win an Olympic medal in rowing.

References 
 
 

1953 births
Living people
Yugoslav male rowers
Serbian male rowers
Sportspeople from Novi Sad
Rowers at the 1976 Summer Olympics
Rowers at the 1980 Summer Olympics
Rowers at the 1984 Summer Olympics
Olympic silver medalists for Yugoslavia
Olympic bronze medalists for Yugoslavia
Olympic rowers of Yugoslavia
Olympic medalists in rowing
Medalists at the 1984 Summer Olympics
Medalists at the 1980 Summer Olympics